The 2004 Guangzhou International Women's Open was a tennis tournament played on outdoor hard courts. It was the inaugural edition of the Guangzhou International Women's Open, and was a Tier III event on the 2004 WTA Tour. It was held in Guangzhou, People's Republic of China, from late September through early October, 2004. Total prize money for the tournament was $170,000.

Finals results

Singles 

 Li Na def.  Martina Suchá, 6–3, 6–4

Doubles 

 Li Ting /  Sun Tiantian def.  Yang Shu-jing /  Yu Ying, 6–4, 6–1

References 

Guangzhou International Women's Open
2004
Guangzhou International Women's Open, 2004
Guangzhou International Women's Open, 2004